Richard Goulooze (born 16 November 1967) is a Dutch former professional footballer who played as a right back. Active in the Netherlands, England, and the United States, he made over 350 career league appearances.

Career
Born in Alkmaar, Goulooze played for FC Huiswaard, Alkmaarsche Boys, AZ, Heerenveen, Derby County, Cambuur, New England Revolution, NEC and Lisse.

After retiring, Goulooze became a businessman, and continued to play master's football.

References

1967 births
Living people
Sportspeople from Alkmaar
Dutch footballers
AZ Alkmaar players
SC Heerenveen players
Derby County F.C. players
SC Cambuur players
New England Revolution players
NEC Nijmegen players
FC Lisse players
Eredivisie players
Eerste Divisie players
English Football League players
Major League Soccer players
Association football fullbacks
Dutch expatriate footballers
Dutch expatriate sportspeople in England
Expatriate footballers in England
Dutch expatriate sportspeople in the United States
Expatriate soccer players in the United States
Footballers from North Holland